Joshua M. Moorby (born 11 July 1998) is a New Zealand rugby union player who plays for the  in Super Rugby and  in the Bunnings NPC. His position is wing or fullback. He was announced in the Highlanders squad as an injury replacement in April 2021 for the 2021 Super Rugby Aotearoa season. He also represented .

Reference list

External links
itsrugby.co.uk profile

1998 births
New Zealand rugby union players
Living people
Rugby union wings
Rugby union fullbacks
Southland rugby union players
Highlanders (rugby union) players
Hurricanes (rugby union) players
Rugby union players from Waikato
Northland rugby union players